The House of Usher is a 2006 American drama thriller film based on the 1839 Edgar Allan Poe short story, "The Fall of the House of Usher". The film was directed by Hayley Cloake and written by Collin Chang. It stars Austin Nichols, Izabella Miko, and Beth Grant.

Plot
Jill Masters (Izabella Miko) has not seen or heard from her ex-lover, Roderick "Rick" Usher (Austin Nichols), or her best friend (Rick's twin), Madeline "Maddy" Usher (Danielle McCarthy), for three years. One night, Rick contacts Jill and informs her of Maddy's sudden death. Her last wish was for Jill to attend the funeral. Conflicted, Jill returns to the family home of the Usher family. Her love affair with Rick is rekindled as she learns he suffers from the same malady that robbed his twin sister, Maddy, of her sharp mind before taking her life. His affliction is manifested in a rare nerve condition, which renders him hypersensitive. Under the watchful eye of the caretaker, Nurse Thatcher (Beth Grant), Jill appears to be haunted by Maddy's ghost.

Meanwhile, Jill becomes intimate with Rick and tells him she has missed her period. A pregnancy test confirms Jill is pregnant. In the meantime, Jill has discovered that the Usher family has practiced twincest for the past five or six generations, right down to Maddy and Rick. All the prior generations had twins, who later became a couple and birthed twins of their own and so on down the line to Maddy and Rick, who were to continue the Usher curse.

Cast
 Austin Nichols as Roderick "Rick" Usher
 Izabella Miko as Jill Michaelson
 Beth Grant as Nurse Thatcher
 Stephen C. Fischer as Rupert Johnson
 Danielle McCarthy as Madeline "Maddy" Usher
 Elizabeth Duff as Nurse Lambert
 Robin Kurian as Shay
 Ann Richardson Howland as Edith

Production
The film was shot throughout Massachusetts: Danvers, Newburyport, and Rowley in April 2005 on a $130,000 budget.

See also
 Edgar Allan Poe in television and film

References

External links
 
 

2006 films
2006 thriller drama films
American independent films
American thriller drama films
Films based on The Fall of the House of Usher
Films shot in Massachusetts
Incest in film
2006 drama films
2006 independent films
2000s English-language films
2000s American films